Hate That Cat is a verse novel written by Sharon Creech published by HarperCollins.

Plot summary
This is the second book about Jack, the first being Love That Dog. Jack is being terrorized by a BLACK cat.  He writes poetry about how much he dislikes the cat. The story follows him through learning to like both cats and poetry.

Reception
Reviews of Hate That Cat have been positive including "Teachers will welcome both Jack’s poems and Creech’s embedded writing lessons." and "Her writing style puts a story into poetic form and creates a book that appeals to reluctant readers and to children of all ages."

The book has also appeared on school reading lists.

References

2008 American novels
American children's novels
Novels by Sharon Creech
Fictional diaries
Verse novels
HarperCollins books
Children's novels about animals
Fiction about animal cruelty
Novels about cats
2008 children's books